25 Field Artillery Regiment was an artillery regiment of the South African Artillery.

Origin

Origin
This unit was originally formed as 25 Composite Regiment on 17 May 1977 and was based in Potchefstroom.
As a composite unit, it comprised
 a couple of gun batteries,
 heavy mortars and,
 counter artillery locating radar elements.(typically using the Cymbeline Mk1 locating radar)

Conversion to a Medium Regiment
By 1984 the regiment was altered with the removal of its mortar and radar and its conversion to a medium regiment.

Operations
On 3 May 1984 the regiment was added to the operational control of Far North Command. As a Citizen Force Regiment, its primary function was artillery support and it secondary function as infantry. The regiment was operational in the border area with Zimbabwe in 1980 and in South West Africa in 1983.

Traditions

Emblem design
The regiment had a typical artillery tradition and instead of having colours considered its cannons its colours. The unit received its ceremonial emblems on 21 September 1984. The emblem has the traditional artillery background colours of red and dark blue separated by a gold glowing line depicting the Mooi River. The gold penny represents efficiency while the strikes typify artillery fire. This design also can be seen to show the radar element which was previously part of the unit.

Commanding Officer saber
Commanding officers were issued a ceremonial saber for the taking over of command.

Commanding officers
Commandant J.P. Aukamp
Commandant H.A. Labuschagne

Insignia

Dress Insignia

References 

 Further reading:

External links
 Defenceweb fact file
 Gunner's Association

Artillery regiments of South Africa
Military units and formations established in 1977
Military units and formations of South Africa in the Border War
Military units and formations of South Africa
Military units and formations disestablished in 1988